Pandita Ramabai Sarasvati (23 April 1858 – 5 April 1922) was an Indian Social Reformer. She was the first woman to be awarded the titles of Pandita as a Sanskrit scholar and Sarasvati after being examined by the faculty of the University of Calcutta. She was one of the ten women delegates of the Congress session of 1889. During her stay in England in early 1880s she converted to Christianity. After that she toured extensively in the United States to collect funds for destitute Indian women. With the funds raised she started Sharada Sadan for child widows. In the late 1890s, she founded Mukti Mission, a Christian charity  at Kedgaon village,  forty miles east of the city of Pune. The mission was later named Pandita Ramabai Mukti Mission.

Early life and education
Pandita Ramabai Sarasvati was born as Ramabai Dongre on 23 April 1858 into a Marathi-speaking Chitpavan Brahmin family. Her father, Anant Shastri Dongre, a Sanskrit scholar, taught her Sanskrit at home. Dongre's extraordinary piety led him to travel extensively across India with his family in tow.  Ramabai gained exposure to public speaking by participating in the family's public recitation of the Purana at pilgrimage sites around India, which is how they earned a meager living.  Orphaned at the age of 16 during the Great Famine of 1876–78, Ramabai and her brother Srinivas continued the family tradition of traveling the country reciting Sanskrit scriptures. Ramabai's fame as a woman adept in Sanskrit reached Calcutta, where the pandits invited her to speak. In 1878, Calcutta University conferred on her the titles of Pandita and Sarasvati in recognition of her knowledge of various Sanskrit works. The theistic reformer Keshab Chandra Sen gave her a copy of the Vedas, the most sacred of all Hindu literature, and encouraged her to read them. After the death of Srinivas in 1880, Ramabai married Bipin Behari Medhvi, a Bengali lawyer. The groom was a Bengali Kayastha, and so the marriage was inter-caste and inter-regional and therefore considered inappropriate for that age. They were married in a civil ceremony on 13 November 1880. The couple had a daughter whom they named Manorama. After Medhvi's death in 1882, Ramabai, who was only 23, moved to Pune and founded an organisation to promote women's education.

Social activism
When in 1882 the Hunter Commission was appointed by the colonial Government of India to look into education, Ramabai gave evidence before it. In an address before the Hunter Commission, she declared, "In ninety-nine cases out of a hundred the educated men of this country are opposed to female education and the proper position of women. If they observe the slightest fault, they magnify the grain of mustard-seed into a mountain, and try to ruin the character of a woman." She suggested that teachers be trained and women school inspectors be appointed. Further, she said that as the situation in India was that women's conditions were such that women could only medically treat them, Indian women should be admitted to medical colleges. Ramabai's evidence created a great sensation and reached Queen Victoria. It bore fruit later in starting of the Women's Medical Movement by Lord Dufferin. In Maharashtra, Ramabai made contact with Christian organizations also involved in women's education and medical missionary work, in particular a community of Anglican nuns, the Community of St. Mary the Virgin (CSMV).

With earnings from the sale of her first book, Stri Dharma Niti ("Morals for Women," 1882) and contacts with the CSMV, Ramabai went to Britain in 1883 to start medical training; she was rejected from medical programs because of progressive deafness. During her stay she converted to Christianity.  Among the reasons Ramabai gave for her conversion was her growing disillusionment with orthodox Hinduism and particularly what she saw as its ill regard of women.  In an autobiographical account of her conversion written years later, Ramabai wrote that there were, "only two things on which all those books, the Dharma Shastras, the sacred epics, the Puranas and modern poets, the popular preachers of the present day and orthodox high-caste men, were agreed, that women of high and low caste, as a class were bad, very bad, worse than demons, as unholy as untruth; and that they could not get Moksha. as men."  Ramabai had a contentious relationship with her Anglican "mentors" in England, particularly Sister Geraldine, and asserted her independence in a variety of ways: she maintained her vegetarian diet, rejected aspects of Anglican doctrine that she regarded as irrational, including the doctrine of the Trinity, and questioned whether the crucifix she was asked to wear had to have a Latin inscription instead of the Sanskrit inscription she wished for.

In 1886, she traveled from Britain to the United States at the invitation of Dr. Rachel Bodley, Dean of the Women's Medical College of Pennsylvania, to attend the graduation of her relative and the first female Indian doctor, Anandibai Joshi, staying for two years. During this time she also translated textbooks and gave lectures throughout the United States and Canada. She also published one of her most important books, The High-Caste Hindu Woman. Her first book written in English, Ramabai dedicated it to her cousin, Dr. Joshi. The High-Caste Hindu Woman  showed the darkest aspects of the life of Hindu women, including child brides and child widows, and sought to expose the oppression of women in Hindu-dominated British India.  Through speaking engagements and the development of a wide network of supporters, Ramabai raised the equivalent of 60,000 rupees to launch a school in India for the child widows whose difficult lives her book exposed.

While giving presentations in the U.S. to seek support for her work in India, Ramabai met American Suffragette and Women's rights activist, Frances Willard in July 1887. Willard invited Ramabai to speak at the national Woman's Christian Temperance Union convention in November 1887 where she gained the support of this large women's organization. She returned to India in June 1888 as a National Lecturer for the WCTU. Mary Greenleaf Clement Leavitt, the first World Missionary of the WCTU, was already there when Ramabai returned, but they did not meet. Ramabai worked however with the WCTU of India once it was officially organized in 1893.

in 1889, she returned to India, and founded a school for child widows in Pune called Sharada Sadan, which had the support of many Hindu reformers, including M.G. Ranade. Although Ramabai did not engage in overt evangelism, she did not hide her Christian faith either, and when several students converted to Christianity, she lost the backing of Pune's Hindu reform circles.  She moved the school 60 kilometers east to the much quieter village of Kedgaon, and changed its name to the Mukti Mission.  In 1896, during a severe famine, Ramabai toured the villages of Maharashtra with a caravan of bullock carts and rescued thousands of outcast children, child widows, orphans, and other destitute women and brought them to the shelter of the Mukti Mission. By 1900 there were 1,500 residents and over a hundred cattle in the Mukti mission.  A learned woman knowing seven languages, she also translated the Bible into her mother tongue—Marathi—from the original Hebrew and Greek. The Pandita Ramabai Mukti Mission is still active today, providing housing, education, vocational training, etc. for many needy groups including widows, orphans, and the blind.

Influence on Early Pentecostalism 
Scholars of Pentecostalism have begun to explore the possibility that rather than having originated in a singular event at the famous Asuza Street Church in Los Angeles in 1906, the origins of Pentecostalism can be traced to religious revivals around the world, which were interpreted by participants as signs of a new era in Christian history.  The extraordinary psycho-physical states that accompanied the emotionally intense revivals took different shape in different places.  Minnie Abrams, Ramabai's American assistant and a veteran missionary with close associations with the Holiness movement, reported that in June 1905, ten months before the Azusa Street revival, a matron came upon a dormitory of girls weeping, praying, and confessing their sins.  Then, one girl testified that she had been startled from sleep by the sensation of being bathed in fire.  As Michael Bergunder has argued, the Mukti Mission was part of a network of Protestant missionary institutions that by the early twentieth century spanned the globe.  This network was constituted by a vast system of newsletters, pamphlets, books and other kinds of print media, along with conferences that brought missionaries into conversation with each other, and travel that took missionaries and supporters from one mission station to the next.  Thus, news about the "holy fire" at the Mukti Mission, along with revivals happening with apparent simultaneity around the world led many to believe a global "outpouring of the Holy Spirit" was underway.  Many missionaries came personally to Kedgaon to visit and volunteer, in response to the news of the outbreak of the Holy Spirit among the students.

Personal life 
In many ways, Pandita Ramabai's family life departed from the norms expected of women in her day.  Her childhood was full of hardships and she lost her parents early.  Her marriage to Bipin Bihari Medhvi crossed caste lines.  Moreover, when her husband died after just two years a marriage, she was left a widow.  Under ordinary circumstances, such a tragedy put nineteenth century Indian women in a vulnerable condition, dependent upon their deceased husband's family for support.  Pandita Ramabai, however, persevered as an independent woman, and a single mother to Manorama Bai. She ensured that Manorama Bai was educated, both in Wantage by the sisters of the CSMV, and later at Bombay University, where Manorama earned her BA.  After going to the United States for higher studies, she returned to India where she worked side-by-side with Ramabai.   Serving first as Principal of Sharada Sadan, she also assisted her mother in establishing  Christian High school at Gulbarga (now in Karnataka), a backward district of south India, during 1912.   In 1920 Ramabai's health began to flag and she designated her daughter as the one who would take over the ministry of Mukti Mission. However, Manorama died in 1921. Her death was a shock to Ramabai. Nine months later, on 5 April 1922,  Ramabai herself died from septic bronchitis, a few weeks before her 64th birthday.

Awards and honors

"Pandit" and "Sarasvati" at Bengal (before going to Britain), recognizing her skills in Sanskrit.
Kaisari-i-Hind Medal for community service in 1919, awarded by the British Colonial Government of India.
She is remembered in the Church of England with a commemoration on 30 April.
On 26 October 1989, in recognition of her contribution to the advancement of Indian women, the Government of India issued a commemorative stamp.

Organisation 
After Medhvi's death (1882), Ramabai moved to Pune where she founded Arya Mahila Samaj (Arya Women's Society). Influenced by the ideals of Jesus Christ, the Brahmo Samaj, and Hindu reformers, the purpose of the society was to promote the cause of women's education and deliverance from the oppression of child marriage.

References

Further reading
 Burton, Antoinette. "Colonial encounters in late-Victorian England: Pandita Ramabai at Cheltenham and Wantage 1883–6." Feminist Review 49.1 (1995): 29–49.
 
 Case, Jay Riley. An Unpredictable Gospel (Oxford University Press, 2012)
 Chakravarti, Uma. Rewriting history: The life and times of Pandita Ramabai (Zubaan, 2014).
Dyer, Helen S.  Pandita Ramabai: the story of her life (1900) online
 Kosambi, Meera. "Indian Response to Christianity, Church and Colonialism: Case of Pandita Ramabai." Economic and Political Weekly (1992): WS61-WS71. online
 White, Keith J. "Insights into child theology through the life and work of Pandita Ramabai." Transformation (2007): 95-102. online

Primary sources
Ramabai, Pandita. Pandita Ramabai's American Encounter: The Peoples of the United States (1889), online
Ramabai Sarasvati, Pandita. The High-Caste Hindu woman (1888) online
 Kosambi, Meera, ed. Pandita Ramabai through her own words: Selected works (Oxford University Press, 2000).
 Shah, A.B., ed.; Sister Geraldine, ed. The Letters and Correspondence of Pandita Ramabai (Maharashtra State Board for Literature and Culture, 1977)

Organisation 
After Medhvi's death (1882), Ramabai moved to Pune where she founded Arya Mahila Samaj (Arya Women's Society). Influenced by the ideals of Jesus Christ, the Brahmo Samaj, and Hindu reformers, the purpose of the society was to promote the cause of women's education and deliverance from the oppression of child marriage.

External links

Life Testimony of Pandita Ramabai
Pandita Ramabai materials in the South Asian American Digital Archive (SAADA)
The Story of Ramabai
A Short History of Mukti Mission 

1858 births
1922 deaths
Converts to Anglicanism from Hinduism
Converts to Protestantism from Hinduism
Indian Anglicans
Recipients of the Kaisar-i-Hind Medal
Translators of the Bible into Marathi
Indian women's rights activists
Indian social reformers
19th-century Indian women
19th-century Indian people
20th-century Indian women
19th-century Indian educational theorists
20th-century Indian educational theorists
Indian women educational theorists
Marathi-language writers
People from Dakshina Kannada district
Activists from Karnataka
Indian women activists
Educators from Karnataka
Women educators from Karnataka
19th-century translators
19th-century women educators
20th-century women educators
Indian women travel writers
Christian revivalists
Indian Protestant missionaries
Missionary linguists
Female Bible Translators